Jose Manuel Lozano, Jr., known as J. M. Lozano (born May 23, 1980), is a Republican member of the Texas House of Representatives for District 43, which consists of the counties of Bee, Jim Wells, Kleberg, and San Patricio. He serves as chairman of the House Committee on Redistricting and vice-chair of the Committee on International Trade. A restaurateur, Lozano lives in Kingsville in Kleberg County with his wife, Avelina, and their three children.

Background

Political life
He is a member of the Eagle Ford Shale Caucus, Tourism Caucus, Rural Caucus, and House Republican Policy Committee, and at various times he has been appointed to the positions of Deputy Floor Leader, chairman of the Committee on Redistricting, and vice-chairman of the Committee on International Trade.

References

 

1980 births
Living people
University of Texas at Austin College of Liberal Arts alumni
University of the Incarnate Word alumni
Members of the Texas House of Representatives
Texas Democrats
Texas Republicans
American politicians of Mexican descent
Politicians from Guadalajara, Jalisco
People from Jim Wells County, Texas
People from McAllen, Texas
People from Kingsville, Texas
American restaurateurs
21st-century American politicians
Baptists from Texas
Latino conservatism in the United States